The Brigianii (Gaulish: *Brigianioi) were a Gallic tribe dwelling around present-day Briançon during the Iron Age and the Roman period.

Name 
They are mentioned as Brigianii by Pliny (1st c. AD), and as Brigiani, Brigantionis and Bricianiorum on inscriptions.

Their name may be based on the Gaulish root brig- ('high, elevated'), or on brīgo- ('might, strength').

Geography 
Their territory was located north of the Caturiges, west of the Quariates, east of the Tricorii, south of the Segovii.

Their chief town was known as Brigantio (modern Briançon), meaning 'eminence, high/elevated place' in Gaulish.

History 
They are mentioned by Pliny the Elder as one of the Alpine tribes conquered by Rome in 16–15 BC, and whose name was engraved on the Tropaeum Alpium.

References

Primary sources

Bibliography 

Historical Celtic peoples
Gauls
Tribes of pre-Roman Gaul